Gordonia alkanivorans  is a bacterium from the genus of Gordonia which has been isolated from soil which was contaminated with tar and phenol in Rositz in Germany. Gordonia alkanivorans has the ability to metabolize hexadecane. The strain RIPI90A of Gordonia alkanivorans can desulfurize dibenzothiophene.

References

Further reading

External links 
Type strain of Gordonia alkanivorans at BacDive -  the Bacterial Diversity Metadatabase

Mycobacteriales
Bacteria described in 1999